Rajabu Hussen is a Tanzanian boxer. He competed in the men's featherweight event at the 1984 Summer Olympics.

References

Year of birth missing (living people)
Living people
Tanzanian male boxers
Olympic boxers of Tanzania
Boxers at the 1984 Summer Olympics
Place of birth missing (living people)
Featherweight boxers